This is a list of TV services available on digital terrestrial, satellite, internet streaming and cable systems in Algeria.

National channels 
List available from 5 March 2017:

See also 
 Television in Algeria

References

Algeria